Michael William Haynes (19 May 1936 – 18 September 1997) was an English first-class cricketer active 1959–61 who played for Nottinghamshire. He was born in Sherwood; died in Nottingham.

References

1936 births
1997 deaths
English cricketers
Nottinghamshire cricketers
People from Sherwood, Nottingham
Cricketers from Nottinghamshire